Phoberia ingenua is a species of moth in the family Erebidae. The species is found in eastern North America and flies in March and April of each year.  The adult males have bipectinate antennae, which distinguish them from the sister species Phoberia atomaris, whose antennae are smooth.

References

Melipotini